James Robert Horner (born August 6, 1957) is an American former professional baseball player.

After a record setting NCAA College athletic career with the Arizona State Sun Devils baseball team, Horner bypassed the minor leagues and moved directly to the major leagues where, together with Dale Murphy, he formed a power-hitting tandem for the Atlanta Braves teams of the early 1980s. Known for his powerful hitting, Horner averaged 35 home runs and 109 runs batted per his 162-game average and, became the 11th player in Major League Baseball history to hit four home runs in one game on July 6, .

Horner became a victim of the Major League Baseball collusion scandal of 1986-87 after courts found that Major League Baseball owners had illegally shared information during free-agency negotiations seeking to deflate player salaries. He was among hundreds of players and former players who were awarded millions of dollars in lost salary. He played one season in Japan for the Yakult Swallows before returning to play one final season in Major League Baseball with the St. Louis Cardinals in 1988. A string of injuries prematurely ended Horner's baseball career after just 11 seasons. He was inducted into the College Baseball Hall of Fame as a member of its inaugural class on July 4, 2006.

Amateur career
Horner was born in Junction City, Kansas, but grew up in Glendale, Arizona, attending Apollo High School where he set school records. His college career at Arizona State University culminated with being named the first winner of the Golden Spikes Award. With his nine home runs in 1976 he is tied with Ike Davis (2006) for third all-time by a Sun Devil freshman, two behind Barry Bonds (1983).

A second baseman for TSN's College All-America team in 1977 and 1978, Horner set a then-NCAA record of 58 career home runs for Arizona State, set a 25-homer single-season record, and was selected the MVP of 1977 College World Series.

Professional career
Horner was drafted by Atlanta with the first overall pick in the 1978 amateur draft, and he made his Major League Baseball debut the same year. He is one of only a handful of players to go directly from college to the starting lineup in the majors without spending a day in the minor leagues. In his first game, he belted a home run off future Hall of Fame pitcher Bert Blyleven of the Pirates. In 89 games, Horner batted .266 with 23 home runs and 63 runs batted in in 323 at-bats, with an on-base percentage of .313 and a slugging percentage of .539. His 23 home runs led all National League third basemen in 1978. He won the National League Rookie of the Year honor over Ozzie Smith.

In 1979, Horner batted .314 with 33 homers and 98 RBIs. In 1980, Horner batted .268, with 35 home runs and 89 RBIs despite being sidelined for a total of 79 games in both seasons after recurring shoulder and leg injuries. In the strike-shortened 1981 season, he hit .277 with 15 home runs and 42 RBIs in 79 games. Horner rejuvenated in 1982, finishing with 32 home runs, 97 RBIs, and an OBP of .350, while slugging .501.

In August 1983, Horner was hitting .303 with 20 homers and a career-high OBP of .383 when he fractured his right wrist while sliding, missing the last 43 games of the season. In May 1984, Horner broke his left wrist while diving after a ball and he was sidelined for the rest of the season.

In 1985, Horner played 130 games and finished with a .267 batting average, 27 home runs, and 89 RBIs. In 1986, Horner set personal highlights. On July 6, 1986, in a game against the Expos, he became the eleventh player in Major League Baseball history to hit four home runs in a single game and only the second one to do so in a game that his team lost (the first one being Ed Delahanty). Later in the season, after hitting a record 210 career home runs without a grand slam, Horner finally belted a homer with the bases loaded to give the Braves a 4–2 victory over the Pirates. Horner's record for homers without a grand slam stood until 1998 when Sammy Sosa surpassed the mark by hitting his first grand slam on the 248th home run of his career.

Horner became a free agent in 1987, after his first season of more than 500 at-bats. Although Horner was still near his peak, the Major League clubs were then colluding to drive down salaries, so no offers were made to Horner, whose asking price was $2 million. (In 2004, Horner received more than $7 million from the successful lawsuit the players filed against the owners and their illegal collusion.) After failing to reach an agreement with an MLB club, Horner signed a $2 million, one-year contract with the Yakult Swallows of Japan's Central League. He was given number 50 by the organization because that was the number of home runs they expected him to hit. He ended up hitting 31 homers and had 73 RBIs for the team.

Despite Yakult offering Horner a reported $10 million for a new three-year contract, Horner returned to the majors in 1988 with the St. Louis Cardinals. After 60 games, however, he injured his left shoulder. After being invited to spring training by the Baltimore Orioles in 1989, Horner announced his retirement.

In his ten-year Major League career, Horner batted .277 with 218 home runs, 685 RBIs, 560 runs, 1,047 hits, 169 doubles, 8 triples, 14 stolen bases, a .340 on-base percentage, and a .499  slugging average in 1,020 games. Defensively, in 684 games at third base, he compiled a .946 fielding percentage, and in 330 games at first base, he posted a .994 fielding percentage. Overall, his career fielding percentage was .977.

Legacy
On July 4, 2006, Horner was inducted into the College Baseball Hall of Fame as a member of its inaugural class.

See also

 List of baseball players who went directly to Major League Baseball
 List of Major League Baseball single-game home run leaders

References

External links

Bob Horner at Baseball Almanac
Bob Horner at Bob Horner - Baseballbiography.com
What Ever Happened to Bob Horner?

1957 births
Living people
People from Junction City, Kansas
Sportspeople from Glendale, Arizona
Golden Spikes Award winners
Major League Baseball Rookie of the Year Award winners
National League All-Stars
Atlanta Braves players
St. Louis Cardinals players
Major League Baseball first basemen
American expatriate baseball players in Japan
Arizona State Sun Devils baseball players
Yakult Swallows players
Baseball players from Kansas
College World Series Most Outstanding Player Award winners
National College Baseball Hall of Fame inductees
All-American college baseball players